People named Batten include:
 Adrian Batten, English (Anglican) composer
 Ann Batten, New Zealand politician
 Billy Batten, English rugby league footballer
 Charles Lynn Batten, an associate professor at University of California, Los Angeles 
 Chris Batten, bassist and a vocalist for the English post-hardcore band Enter Shikari
 Cyia Batten, an American dancer and actor
 Eric Batten, English rugby league footballer
 Frank Batten, namesake of the Batten School of Leadership and Public Policy
 Frederick Batten, an English neurologist and pediatrician
 George Batten (disambiguation)
 Gerard Batten, member of the European Parliament and former leader of UKIP party 
 Guin Batten, rowing champion, younger sister of Miriam
 Herman Batten, Canadian politician
 James Batten, chief executive officer of Knight-Ridder publishing
 Jean Batten, New Zealand aviator
 John Batten (disambiguation)
 Jennifer Batten, a guitarist and author
 Joseph Batten, English academic administrator
 Karen Batten (Karen Pence, born 1958), American schoolteacher and former Second Lady of the United States
 Karen Lee Batten, a country music singer
 Kim Batten, retired female American champion hurdler
 Lynn Batten, Canadian–Australian mathematician
 Matthew Batten, American baseball player
 Miriam Batten, winner of gold at the 1998 World Rowing Championships
 Norman Batten, an American racecar driver
 Peter Batten, British actor and voice-actor
 Ray Batten, English rugby league footballer
 Shawn Batten, American soap opera actress
 Susan Batten, American soap opera actress
 Timothy Batten, American judge
 William Batten, British sailor; son of Andrew Batten, a master in the Royal Navy

See also
Batten (disambiguation)